Superheterodyne transmitter is a radio or TV transmitter which uses an intermediate frequency signal in addition to radio frequency signal.

Types of transmitters 

There are two types of transmitters. In some transmitters, the information signal (audio (AF), video (VF) etc.) modulates the radio frequency (RF) signal. These direct modulation transmitters are relatively simple transmitters.

In more complicated transmitters which are called superheterodyne, the information signal modulates an intermediate frequency (IF) signal. After stages for correction, equalization and sometimes amplification, the IF signal is converted to an RF signal by a stage named frequency mixer or frequency converter. Superheterodyne transmitters are more complex than direct modulation transmitters.

Mathematical approach 

Let 
 be the information signal
 be the angular RF,
 be the angular IF and
 be the angular subcarrier frequency.

In direct modulation transmitter the information signal modulates the RF carrier. If the type of modulation is conventional amplitude modulation the RF output is,

 

Likewise in superheterodyne transmitter the modulated IF is;
 
 

This signal is applied to a frequency mixer. The other input to the mixer is a high frequency subcarrier signal.

 
The two signals are multiplied to give;

 

Applying well known rules of trigonometry;

A filter at the output of the mixer filters out one of the terms at the right (usually the summation) leaving RF

 

Here  is the required angular RF; i.e., 

After phase and amplitude equalization,

Advantages of superheterodyne 

 In transmitters several correction and equalization stages are used after modulation. In direct modulation these stages must be developed separately for each output RF (so called channel). On the other hand, in superheterodyne transmitters since a single intermediate frequency signal is used, only one type of stage for IF is developed. Thus the said stages are more reliable in superheterodyne. Also R&D  is much easier for the designer.
 Operators may change the RF output of the transmitter. In direct modulation, it is very difficult to change the RF output. Because in this case, practically all stages need to be retuned for the new RF. On the other hand, in superheterodyne only the output stages need to be retuned.
 With a fast enough DAC, the modulated IF signal can be generated directly, digitally from a microprocessor or a digital signal processor. This will permit usage of more advanced methods of modulation without the use of complicated modulator hardware, and make software-defined radio possible.

See also 

 TV transmitters
 Superheterodyne receiver
 TV transmitter topics

Broadcast engineering
Television technology
Broadcast transmitters